Ronald Waters is a Democratic politician and former member of the Pennsylvania House of Representatives, where he represented District 191. He was elected on May 18, 1999 in a special election. On June 1, 2015, he pleaded guilty to a bribery charge and was forced to resign his seat.

References

External links
Pennsylvania House Democratic Caucus - Ronald Waters official Party website

Living people
Democratic Party members of the Pennsylvania House of Representatives
African-American state legislators in Pennsylvania
American politicians convicted of bribery
Pennsylvania politicians convicted of crimes
21st-century American politicians
Year of birth missing (living people)
21st-century African-American politicians